Bloody Birthday is a 1981 American slasher film directed by Ed Hunt, produced by Gerald T. Olson, and starring Susan Strasberg, José Ferrer, and Lori Lethin. Its plot follows a group of three children born on the same day during a solar eclipse who begin committing murders on their tenth birthdays. Despite mixed reception, it has since accrued a cult following.

Plot

On June 9, 1970, at the Meadowvale General Hospital in Southern California, a doctor arrives to attend to three women in labor at the same time during a solar eclipse. Two boys and a girl are born - Curtis Taylor, Debbie Brody, and Steven Seton.

Ten years later, on June 1, 1980, a young couple named Annie Smith and Duke Benson fool around in a cemetery at night when they are attacked and killed by unknown assailants. That same night, Joyce is interrupted from the horoscopes she's working on when her brother Timmy sneaks in the window, and lies about having locked himself out while feeding the dog.

The next day, on June 2, Joyce arrives at the Thomas Jefferson Elementary School, where she is volunteering for her Civics class, to find Sheriff Brody talking to Ms. Davis' class about the murder. He shows the children a jump rope handle and asks if anyone was in the cemetery the night before. Debbie and Curtis exchange glances but say nothing. After the teacher refuses to let the class go until she has officially dismissed them, the Sheriff leaves, saying goodbye to his daughter, Debbie. Debbie, Curtis and Steven ask Ms. Davis not to assign homework because everyone will be at their birthday party next week, but she turns them down. When the three arrive at Debbie's house after school, she brings Curtis and Steven to the closet in her room and charges them each a quarter to watch through a peephole as her older sister Beverly strips down and dances around while she's changing clothes.

Later, Debbie calls her father outside while skipping rope. After he narrowly evades a skateboard laid by Curtis on the stairs, Debbie drops her skipping rope on the ground, showing him that it is missing its handle. While he is distracted, Steven beats the sheriff from behind with his wooden baseball bat as Debbie watches on. Timmy shows up while Steven, Curtis and Debbie are arranging the Sheriff's body on the stairs, making Debbie quickly call for her mother, saying that their father fell and hurt himself.

After the sheriff's funeral, Curtis, Steven, and Timmy go playing hide-and-seek in the junkyard. While Steven counts, Curtis dares Timmy to hide inside an old refrigerator, and then locks him in. Timmy manages to escape and returns home, where he tells Joyce about the incident. However, she doesn't believe him because of his earlier lie, and he admits that he'd gone to Debbie's that night hoping to be able to use the peephole. Elsewhere, Debbie pastes a picture of Ms. Davis in her scrapbook, as well as an article about her father's death.

That night, Debbie turns off the house security system and lets Curtis switch his replica gun with the sheriff's revolver. A few days later, Curtis shoots Ms. Davis with the revolver; Joyce later discovers the body in a closet. Meanwhile, Timmy attacks Curtis on the playground for locking him in the refrigerator, and on his way home is lured up to Debbie's tree house, where she almost pushes him off the edge onto a garden spike, but is interrupted by the phone ringing.

Upon returning home, Joyce finds a note from Timmy, telling her he is in the junkyard. When she goes looking for him, Curtis and Steven try to run her over with a junk car, wearing a sheet with holes cut in it like a ghost to avoid being identified. She manages to avoid the car, tricking them into driving over a short drop-off. A police officer arrives and Joyce tells him what happened, but the kids are gone.

That night, Joyce shows Timmy how she creates horoscopes. She says the solar eclipse that occurred during the births of Debbie, Curtis, and Steven blocked Saturn, the planet controlling the way a person treats other people, which means that something is missing from their personalities. Curtis waits outside with the revolver, hoping to kill them, but is startled by the headlights of a neighbors station wagon leaving. Curtis runs away and encounters a couple in a van on another street. Once the couple in the van begin to have sex, he shoots them instead. Similarly, Debbie looks through the peephole at her sister, aiming an arrow at her, but does not shoot.

At Curtis, Steven, and Debbie's birthday party on June 9, Curtis tricks Joyce into believing that he poisoned the cake to make her look crazy. Later, there's a brief moment of panic when she and Timmy think their house has been broken into, but it's only Joyce's college boyfriend.

That evening, Beverly discovers Debbie's scrapbook of kills. She confronts Debbie over it and then shows the scrapbook to their mother. Debbie lies and says the scrapbook belongs to Curtis, so their mother forbids Debbie from hanging out with him and tells Beverly to burn the book, which she does. That night, Debbie calls Curtis and Steven to her house, then kills Beverly with a bow and arrow after tricking her into looking through the peephole. When the boys arrive, they are disappointed that she didn't wait for them, but help her move the body away from the house so it can be discovered. When her mother catches Debbie mopping up the blood on Beverly's floor, she lies and says it was nail polish.

After Beverly's funeral, a distraught Mrs. Brody checks herself into the hospital. Curtis, Steven, and Debbie enjoy their freedom playing tag at Debbie's house, during which Curtis demonstrates that he can rewire the security system to lock all the doors to the house. When Timmy shows up and throws rocks at their window, they chase him down and almost succeed in strangling him with a garden hose before Joyce intervenes. Debbie once again blames Curtis and Steven and makes herself look innocent. When Joyce threatens to call the Sheriff, Curtis says he'll just think she's crazy, and threatens to have her arrested for assaulting a minor; Joyce thus lets them go.

The next day, Debbie pastes a picture of Joyce into her scrapbook. Later, she tells Joyce that her mother has to see a psychiatrist that night, and asks if she and Timmy can babysit her at 7pm. Joyce agrees, unaware of her trap. After Joyce and Timmy arrive at Debbie's house, she lets Curtis and Steven in the back door, and Curtis rewires the security system to lock them in. Curtis and Steven try to shoot Joyce, while Debbie uses her jump rope and bow and arrow in an attempt to kill the two. After several near misses, they manage to lock Steven in a trunk, and subdue Curtis after he runs out of bullets.

While Timmy runs to a neighbor's house to call the police, Debbie escapes through a window just as her mother arrives home. She lies to her mother about Curtis and Steven, saying that they did bad things and Joyce was going to blame her for it. Her mother believes her and flees with her. The police arrest Curtis and Steven, much to the shock and anger of the townsfolk. As he is taken away, Curtis gives Joyce and Timmy an evil smirk.

In the final scene, Debbie is playing with a large car jack outside a motel someplace else. When her mother comes out looking for her, she calls her Beth – they've changed their names and moved to a new town. Her mother makes Debbie recite her new name again, and Debbie promises to be a good girl from then on. The two leave, leaving behind a driver who is crushed underneath a nearby truck.

Cast

Release
Bloody Birthday was given a belated limited release theatrically in the United States by Rearguard Productions in 1981.  It was later released on VHS by Prism Entertainment in 1986 and Starmaker Entertainment in 1990.

The film was officially released on DVD by VCI Home Video in 2003.

It was released on Blu-ray by 88 Films in 2014.
Arrow Video also released it on Blu-ray in 2018.

Critical reception 
Bloody Birthday received mixed-to-negative reviews from critics, but the performances (particularly those of Jayne, Freeman, and Hoy) were praised. Allmovie called it "a bloody-fun time that's great for all of the wrong reasons." 

On Rotten Tomatoes the film holds a 71% based on 7 reviews, with an average rating of 5.2 out of 10.
On Metacritic, it has a score of 49%, indicating "mixed or average reviews".

See also
 Slasher film
 List of films featuring eclipses

References

External links

 

1981 films
Films set in 1970
Films set in 1980
1981 horror films
1980s slasher films
1980s English-language films
American slasher films
Sororicide in fiction
Films set in California
Fiction about familicide
Films about children
1980s American films